Coleophora plumbella is a moth of the family Coleophoridae. It is found from Fennoscandia to Romania.

The wingspan is 9–10 mm. Adults are on wing in June and July.

The larvae feed on Vaccinium uliginosum. They probably create a composite leaf case. Larvae can be found from late August to spring.

References

plumbella
Moths of Europe
Moths described in 1941